The State Enterprise "Ukrainian Institute of Industrial Property" or Ukrainian Patent Office (Ukrpatent or SE "UIPV") was created under the order of the Ministry of the Science and Education of Ukraine on July 7, 2000. Ukrpatent is the only institution in Ukraine authorized to deal with intellectual property (IP) matters (patents, trademarks, industrial designs, utility models, geographical indications etc.).

Main activities 

 To receive the applications for the granting the title of protection;
 Conduction of the examination with conformity to the legal protection requirements;
 State registration of the industrial property objects, change of the legal status and official publication of the correspondent information;
 Participation in the improvement of the IP legislation of Ukraine;
 Formation of the national patent documentation fund.

External links 
 
 

Patent offices
Government of Ukraine